Andrea Bonetti (born 8 August 2003) is an Italian footballer who plays as a midfielder for  club Juventus Next Gen.

Club career 
Having been born in Turin on 8 August 2003, Bonetti's first career years were at Accademia Grugliasco. He continued at Accademia Intertorino, where he actracted Juventus' attention, which he joined in 2017. Playing as a centre-forward, he was the most prolific Juventus U16 player of the 2018–19 season with 16 goals. With time, he moved down the pitch, becoming a midfielder able to play as a regista, a left mezz'ala and as a trequartista. In the 2021–22 season, which he played as a regista for the under-19 side, he scored five goals and gave five assists in 43 appearances in all competitions. On 9 October 2021, Juventus first-team manager Massimiliano Allegri played Bonetti for about 30 minutes, coming on as a substitute for Arthur Melo at the 63rd minute, in a friendly match against Alessandria, which they won 2–1. He made his Juventus Next Gen—the reserve team of Juventus—debut on 3 September 2022, in a 2–0 Serie C win against Trento, coming on as a substitute at the 64th minute for Enzo Barrenechea. His Next Gen debut as a starter came on 17 September, in Renate–Juventus Next Gen 3–2. He came off the pitch after 60 minutes for defender Félix Nzouango, when Next Gen were losing 3–0. On 3 November, he renewed with Juventus until 30 June 2025.

International career 
Bonetti played nine matches with Italy U15. His debut came on 15 February 2018 in a match against Netherlands U15 lost 2–0. On 29 April, he scored the winning goal in Italy–Mexico 1–0. He won five U16 caps between 2018 and 2019 and won two U17 caps between 2019 and 2020.

Career statistics

References 

2003 births
Living people
Juventus F.C. players
Juventus Next Gen players
Italian footballers
Association football midfielders
Footballers from Turin
Italy youth international footballers